Nawa may be:
Nahuatl, in Mexico
any of several Panoan languages, such as:
Yora language
Moa Nawa language